Methanococci is a class of methanogenic archaea in the phylum Euryarchaeota. They can be mesophilic, thermophilic or hyperthermophilic.

References

Further reading

Scientific journals

Scientific books

Scientific databases

External links

Archaea classes
Euryarchaeota